Miroslav Vejvoda (5 July 1932 – 10 January 1994) was a Czech sailor. He competed at the 1964 Summer Olympics and the 1972 Summer Olympics.

References

External links
 

1932 births
1994 deaths
Czech male sailors (sport)
Olympic sailors of Czechoslovakia
Sailors at the 1964 Summer Olympics – Finn
Sailors at the 1972 Summer Olympics – Finn
Sportspeople from Prague